Johanna Mary Sheehy Skeffington (née Sheehy; 24 May 1877 – 20 April 1946) was a suffragette and Irish nationalist. Along with her husband Francis Sheehy Skeffington, Margaret Cousins and James Cousins, she founded the Irish Women's Franchise League in 1908 with the aim of obtaining women's voting rights. She was later a founding member of the Irish Women Workers' Union. Her son Owen Sheehy-Skeffington became a politician and Irish senator.

Early life
Hanna Sheehy was born in Kanturk, County Cork, Ireland, the daughter of Elizabeth "Bessie" McCoy and David Sheehy, an ex-Fenian and an MP for the Irish Parliamentary Party, representing South Galway. Hanna spent her earliest years in a millhouse which her father also grew up in.  When Hanna was three years old the family relocated to Loughmore, Tipperary. Hanna had six siblings, one of whom died at an unknown age; there is very little written about this child. Her siblings were Margaret, born 1875; Eugene, born 1882; Richard, born 1884; Mary Sheehy Kettle, born 1884; and Kathleen Cruise O'Brien, born 1886. One of her uncles, Father Eugene Sheehy, was known as the Land League Priest, and his activities landed him in prison. He was also one of Éamon de Valera's teachers in Limerick.

When Hanna's father became an MP in 1887, the family moved to Hollybank, Drumcondra, Dublin. The family lived next door to the Lord Mayor of Dublin and poet of "God Save Ireland", T.D. Sullivan.

Hanna was sent to Germany for a short period when she was 18 years old to get treatment for tuberculosis.

After graduating from the Royal University of Ireland, she worked in Paris for a time as an au pair, returning to Ireland in 1902.

Hanna's brother Richard was close friends with James Joyce. Joyce wrote about the Sheehys in his acclaimed novel Ulysses, depicting Bessie as a 'social climbing matriarch', a description to which she vehemently objected.
 When Hanna was a teenager, the Sheehys held an open house on the second Sunday night of each month, at 2 Belvedere Place near Mountjoy Square in Dublin. They encouraged young people to visit them and their six children. James Joyce, who was a student at the nearby Belvedere College, and his younger brother Stanislaus, were regular visitors in 1896–1897. Joyce nursed a secret love for her sister Mary, the prettiest girl in the family (and later Mrs. Tom Kettle). The Sheehys were fond of singing and playing games and would ask their guests to sing.

Education 
Hanna was educated at the Dominican Convent on Eccles Street, where she was a prize-winning pupil. She then enrolled at St Mary's University College, a third-level college for women established by the Dominicans in 1893, to study modern languages (in her case, French and German). She sat for examinations at Royal University of Ireland and received a Bachelor of Arts degree in 1899, and a Master of Arts Degree with first-class honours in 1902. This led to a career as a teacher in Eccles Street and an examiner in the Intermediate Certificate examination.

Personal life 

Hanna was introduced to Francis Skeffington, from County Down, by mutual friend James Joyce, who went to university with Skeffington.

The couple would meet regularly in Bewley's Cafe to discuss politics, the arts and religion.

Hanna married Francis Skeffington on 3 June 1903 at University Chapel in St. Stephen's Green, Dublin. The couple wore their graduation gowns as a substitute for a traditional wedding gown and suit. Both husband and wife took the surname Sheehy Skeffington as a symbol of their honour for one another. This gesture angered Dr. J.B., Francis's father, as it was seen as an act of betrayal to their family's name.

The couple moved to 36 Airfield Road, Rathgar, Dublin, shortly after the ceremony. This was an area considered Pro-British at the time.

Sheehy Skeffington had a son named Owen. (In 2014, Owen's daughter, Dr Micheline Sheehy Skeffington, won a gender discrimination case against NUI Galway.)

Her sister Mary married the writer and politician Thomas Kettle. Another sister, Kathleen, married Frank Cruise O'Brien, and was the mother of Conor Cruise O'Brien. The fourth of the sisters, Margaret, married a solicitor, John Culhane, and later the poet Michael Casey. Their two brothers worked as lawyers.

Political life 
Hanna Sheehy Skeffington was born into a strongly republican family. She was influenced by James Connolly and during the 1913 lock-out worked with other suffragists in Liberty Hall, providing food for the families of the strikers.

Sheehy Skeffington fought hard to get women the right to vote in Ireland, founding the IWFL in 1908 and also founding the publication "The Irish Citizen" with her husband. Her strong republican ties were also shown as she helped in the 1916 rising by delivering messages and food to the GPO.

She strongly opposed participation in the First World War which broke out in August 1914, and was prevented by the British government from attending the International Congress of Women held in The Hague in April 1915. The following June her husband was imprisoned for anti-recruiting activities. He was later shot dead during the 1916 Easter Rising, after having been arrested by British soldiers. She did not find out about his death until two days had passed. Sheehy Skeffington refused compensation for her husband's death. Lillian Metge, a regular Citizen reporter and suffragette friend ( who bought Hanna suitably coloured shoes at one time) wrote in sympathy and sharing her grief.

She aligned herself with Sinn Féin, giving them her support. In December 1916 she went to the US to talk about the fight for Irish independence and to raise awareness on behalf of Sinn Féin, attending 250 meetings. On her return, in 1917, she became an executive of Sinn Féin. In October 1917 she was the sole Irish representative to League of Small and Subject Nationalities where, along with several other contributors, she was accused of pro-German sympathies. She published British Militarism as I Have Known It, which was banned in the United Kingdom until after the First World War. Upon her return to Britain she was once again imprisoned, this time in Holloway prison. After her release, Sheehy Skeffington attended the 1918 Irish Race Convention in New York City and later supported the anti-Treaty IRA during the Irish Civil War.

In 1920 she joined Dublin Corporation as a councillor and in 1926 she joined Fianna Fáil as an executive; however, she only kept this position for one year. During the 1930s she was assistant editor of An Phoblacht a journal of the Irish Republican Army. In January 1933 she was arrested in Newry for breaching an exclusion order banning her from Northern Ireland. At her trial she said: "I recognise no partition. I recognise it as no crime to be in my own country. I would be ashamed of my own name and my murdered husband's name if I did… Long live the Republic!" and was sentenced to a month's imprisonment.

At the 1943 general election, at the age of 66, Sheehy Skeffington stood for the Dáil as an independent candidate in the Dublin South constituency. She received 917 votes (1.7%) and was not elected.

Involvement in feminism 
 
Sheehy Skeffington was a founding member of the Irish Women Workers' Union and an author whose works deeply opposed British imperialism in Ireland.  Sheehy Skeffington was a close friend of trade unionist and fellow suffragette Cissie Cahalan. The Irish Women's Franchise League was formed in November 1908, with Hanna Sheehy Skeffington among its founding members, along with her husband Francis Sheehy Skeffington, Margaret Cousins and James Cousins. Although it began with only twelve founding members, the I.W.F.L grew to become one of the largest suffrage groups that existed in the early twentieth century. The I.W.F.L. was a militant organisation that focused on trying to fight issues like the lack of Irish independence and the exclusion of women from the voting process in accordance with the Home Rule Bill and the absence of women's rights in general.

The IWFL's main goal was to ensure that votes for women were included in the proposed Home Rule Bill. Meetings on a weekly basis were held in Dublin's Phoenix Park, alongside organised rallies throughout the country. According to Margaret Cousins, their work was met with much hostility, yet by 1912 it was estimated they had approximately 1000 members, making it Ireland's largest suffrage society.

On 13 June 1912, she, along with seven other women, was arrested for smashing the glass windows of Dublin Castle. On 20 June she was convicted, along with fellow suffragettes Margaret Palmer and Jane and Margaret Murphy. They served a month-long sentence in Mountjoy prison, alongside another month after they refused to pay a fine. They were granted the privileges of political prisoners.

In November 1913 Sheehy Skeffington attempted to present leaflets to the Conservative Party leader, Bonar Law, and the Ulster Unionist leader, Sir Edward Carson. She was arrested after assaulting a police officer and was sent to Mountjoy Prison again. She went on a hunger strike for five days until her release.

Sheehy Skeffington was dismissed in 1913 from her job as a teacher at Rathmines School of Commerce for her continued involvement in feminist militancy.

In August 1918 she was arrested on Westmoreland Street. She was taken to Bridewell Jail and then Holloway Jail where she went on hunger strike.

Alongside Maud Gonne and Charlotte Despard, Sheehy Skeffington helped establish the Women's Prisoners' Defence League, to campaign and fundraise for over 7000 republicans who were imprisoned as a consequence of the Irish Civil War.

The Women's International League for Peace and Freedom held its annual conference in Dublin in July 1926. Sheehy Skeffington attended, along with twenty-one other Irish delegates. The president of the W.I.L.F.P.F, Jane Addams praised the bravery of Francis Sheehy Skeffington, for which Hanna was grateful. Hanna also attended the conference in 1929 in Prague.

In January 1933, she entered Northern Ireland to speak on behalf of the female republican prisoners being held in Armagh jail. She had been barred from entering Northern Ireland because of her political record and was subsequently arrested and held for fifteen days.

In 1935 she spoke out on behalf of the Women Graduates' Association against the Conditions of Employment Bill, which was set to restrict the opportunities of employment for women.

In 1937 she became a founding member of the Women's Social and Progressive League, because of her dissatisfaction with parts of the new Irish Constitution relating to women.

The Irish Citizen 1912–1920 
The Irish Citizen was a feminist newspaper launched by Hanna Sheehy Skeffington and Margaret Cousins. It was first published on 25 May 1912 as an eight-page weekly newspaper. By June 1912 it was selling 3,000 copies and reaching up to 10,000 readers. The motto of the newspaper was, ‘For Men and Women Equally The Rights of Citizenship; For Men and Women Equally The Duties of Citizenship’.

Francis Sheehy Skeffington and James Cousins, the husbands of Hanna Sheehy Skeffington and Margaret Cousins, were the first editors of the publication.

Hanna, in October 1919 said that the newspaper was founded "to further the cause of Woman Suffrage and Feminism in Ireland... In addition, it had stood for the rights of Labour, especially for the rights of women workers... we stood for the self-determination of Ireland." The newspaper covered topics such as Home Rule, Nationalism, and Feminism. It gave women and the suffragette movement their own voice to express their views. Lillian Metge, from Lisburn, wrote articles for the newspaper throughout the suffrage campaign and during World War One.

Hanna Sheehy Skeffington took over the position of editor when her husband was shot in 1916 and remained in this role, on and off, until 1920 when the publication ceased.

Lecture tours in America 1917–1923 
After the verdict in the court-martial of Bowen-Colthurst referring to her husband's death, Hanna was not satisfied with the outcome and decided to bring her story to America. She spoke at over 250 meetings for nineteen months across the United States expressing 'British Militarism'.

Hanna first appeared on 6 January 1917 at Carnegie Hall, New York City. From then onwards, she toured the New England States and the East: Boston, where The Boston Globe describe her as "a wonderful woman. Her self-restraint and self-control were remarkable". Pittsfield, Massachusetts where The Pittsfield Daily News reported that: "Those present were simply amazed at the wonderful poise and self-control of the speaker as she told stories perpetrated by the military authorities in Dublin that made the audience gasp with horror".

She also addressed huge crowds in New Haven, Springfield, Westfield, Hartford, Bridgeport, Lawrence, Meriden, Torrington, Fitchburg, New Bedford, Salem, Lowell, Worcester, Malden, Holyoke and Waterbury. She also had talks at Columbia and Harvard Universities.

From the 25th of February, Hanna travelled to the Midwest. She had the most successful meetings at the Orchestra Hall, Chicago with over 3,000 people which included prominent figures of Chicago. Journalists, Supreme Court Justices, clergy, labour leaders, pacifists, suffragists, newspapermen and socialists also attended her lecture tours.

Hanna returned to the East on March 4 and to the Midwest on April 11. Her tours start to move westward in the spring of 1917. She travelled to California, Los Angeles, Seattle, Portland, Montana, Butte, Pasadena and San Francisco.

Hanna wanted to tour New Mexico, Nebraska, Missouri and Alaska using her contacts as she wanted to extend her tours to various cities but it came to no avail.

In January 1918, Hanna received a petition from the women of Cumann na mBan. The petition "put forth the claim of Ireland for self-determination and appealed to President Wilson to include Ireland among the small nations for whose freedom America was fighting".

For the rest of the upcoming months until June, Hanna returned to the Midwest and San Francisco. She also spoke in Madison Square Garden in May before leaving New York City with her son, Owen Sheehy-Skeffington on 27 June 1918, ending the first round of her lecture tours.

For the second round of her lectures, she replaced Muriel MacSwiney who was called back to Ireland by Eamon de Valera. She continued the Western section of the United States along with Kathleen Boland and Linda Kearns in 1922.

They travelled to the East and the Midwest because they wanted to raise funds for the relief of Irish prisoners and their families. In their speeches, they focused on the conditions in Ireland at the time of the War of Independence. During their tour which ended in May 1923, the delegation raised $123,000.

Bibliography 
 
 Impressions of Sinn Féin in America: An Account of Eighteen Months' Irish Propaganda in the United States. (1919)
 In Dark and Evil Days. (1936)

Later life and death 
She died, aged 68, in Dublin, and is buried with her husband in Glasnevin Cemetery.

Legacy 

There is a bronze statue of her in Kanturk, County Cork, Ireland.

In the 1990s, some of the students of Women's Studies in University College Dublin petitioned to rename their Gender Studies building after Hanna in order to honour her contribution to women's rights and equal access to third-level education. Her husband Francis Sheehy-Skeffington was himself an alumnus of the university and Hanna of the Royal University, a sister university of UCD. Their campaign was successful and the building was renamed the Hanna Sheehy Skeffington Building.

Her name and picture (and those of 58 other women's suffrage supporters) are on the plinth of the statue of Millicent Fawcett in Parliament Square, London, unveiled in 2018.

A blue plaque commemorating Sheehy Skeffington's breaking of windows at Dublin Castle during a protest for women's right to vote can be found on the Ship Street side of Dublin Castle. and her papers are held in the National Library of Ireland as part of the 'Sheehy Skeffington Papers' collection.

Further reading

References

External links
 
 
 

1877 births
1946 deaths
20th-century Irish women politicians
Alumni of the Royal University of Ireland
Burials at Glasnevin Cemetery
Irish socialist feminists
Irish suffragists
Irish women's rights activists
People from Kanturk
People of the Irish Civil War (Anti-Treaty side)